The Division Bell is the fourteenth studio album by the English progressive rock band Pink Floyd, released on 28 March 1994 by EMI Records in the United Kingdom and on 4 April by Columbia Records in the United States.

The second Pink Floyd album recorded without founding member Roger Waters, The Division Bell was written mostly by guitarist and singer David Gilmour and keyboardist Richard Wright. It features Wright's first lead vocal on a Pink Floyd album since The Dark Side of the Moon (1973). Gilmour's fiancée, the novelist Polly Samson, co-wrote many of the lyrics, which deal with themes of communication. It was the last Pink Floyd studio album to be composed of entirely new material, and the last recorded with Wright, who died in 2008.

Recording took place in locations including the band's Britannia Row Studios and Gilmour's houseboat, Astoria. The production team included longtime Pink Floyd collaborators such as producer Bob Ezrin, engineer Andy Jackson, saxophonist Dick Parry and bassist Guy Pratt.

The Division Bell received mixed reviews, but reached number one in more than 10 countries, including the UK and the US. In the US, it was certified double platinum in 1994 and triple platinum in 1999. Pink Floyd promoted it with a tour of the US and Europe; the tour sold more than 5 million tickets and made around $100 million in gross income. A live album and video, Pulse, was released in 1995. Some of the unused material from the Division Bell sessions became part of Pink Floyd's next album, The Endless River (2014).

Recording

In January 1993, guitarist David Gilmour, drummer Nick Mason and keyboardist Richard Wright began improvising new material in sessions at the remodelled Britannia Row Studios. They recruited bassist Guy Pratt, who had joined them on their Momentary Lapse of Reason Tour; according to Mason, Pratt's playing influenced the mood of the music. Without the legal problems that had dogged the production of their 1987 album A Momentary Lapse of Reason, Gilmour was at ease. If he felt the band were making progress, he would record them on a two-track DAT recorder. At one point, Gilmour surreptitiously recorded Wright playing, capturing material that formed the basis for three pieces of music.

After about two weeks, the band had around 65 pieces of music. With engineer Andy Jackson and co-producer Bob Ezrin, production moved to Gilmour's houseboat and recording studio, Astoria. The band voted on each track, and whittled the material down to about 27 pieces. Eliminating some tracks, and merging others, they arrived at about 11 songs. Song selection was based upon a system of points, whereby all three members would award marks out of ten to each candidate song, a system skewed by Wright awarding his songs ten points each and the others none. Wright, having resigned under pressure from bassist Roger Waters in the 1970s, was not contractually a full member of the band, which upset him. Wright reflected: "It came very close to a point where I wasn't going to do the album, because I didn't feel that what we'd agreed was fair." Wright received his first songwriting credits on any Pink Floyd album since 1975's Wish You Were Here.

Gilmour's fiancée, the novelist Polly Samson, also received songwriting credits. Initially, her role was limited to providing encouragement for Gilmour, but she helped him write "High Hopes", a song about Gilmour's childhood in Cambridge. She co-wrote a further six songs, which bothered Ezrin. Gilmour said that Samson's contributions had "ruffled the management's [feathers]", but Ezrin later reflected that her presence had been inspirational for Gilmour, and that she "pulled the whole album together". She also helped Gilmour with the cocaine addiction he had developed following his divorce.

Keyboardist Jon Carin, percussionist Gary Wallis, and backing vocalists including Sam Brown and Momentary Lapse tour singer Durga McBroom were brought in before recording began. The band moved to Olympic Studios and recorded most of the tracks over the space of a week. After a summer break, they returned to Astoria to record more backing tracks. Ezrin worked on the drum sounds, and Pink Floyd collaborator Michael Kamen provided the string arrangements, which were recorded at Abbey Road Studio Two by Steve McLaughlin. Dick Parry played saxophone on his first Pink Floyd album for almost 20 years, on "Wearing the Inside Out", and Chris Thomas created the final mix. Between September and December recording and mixing sessions were held at Metropolis Studios in Chiswick and the Creek Recording Studios in London. In September, Pink Floyd performed at a celebrity charity concert at Cowdray House, in Midhurst. The album was mastered at the Mastering Lab in Los Angeles, by Doug Sax and James Guthrie.

Jackson edited unused material from the Division Bell sessions, described by Mason as ambient music, into an hour-long composition tentatively titled The Big Spliff, but Pink Floyd decided not to release it. Some of The Big Spliff was used to create the band's next album, The Endless River (2014).

Instrumentation
With the aid of Gilmour's guitar technician, Phil Taylor, Carin located some of Pink Floyd's older keyboards from storage, including a Farfisa organ. Sounds sampled from these instruments were used on "Take It Back" and "Marooned". Additional keyboards were played by Carin, along with Bob Ezrin. Durga McBroom supplied backing vocals alongside Sam Brown, Carol Kenyon, Jackie Sheridan, and Rebecca Leigh-White.

"What Do You Want from Me" is influenced by Chicago blues, and "Poles Apart" contains folksy overtones. Gilmour's improvised guitar solos on "Marooned" used a DigiTech Whammy pedal to pitch-shift the guitar notes over an octave. On "Take It Back", he used a Gibson J-200 guitar through a Zoom effects unit, played with an EBow, an electronic device which produces sounds similar to a bow.

Themes
The Division Bell deals with themes of communication and the idea that talking can solve many problems. In the Studio radio host Redbeard suggested that the album offers "the very real possibility of transcending it all, through shivering moments of grace". Songs such as "Poles Apart" and "Lost for Words" have been interpreted by fans and critics as references to the estrangement between Pink Floyd and former band member Roger Waters, who left in 1985; however, Gilmour denied this, and said: "People can invent and relate to a song in their personal ways, but it's a little late at this point for us to be conjuring Roger up." The title refers to the division bell rung in the British parliament to announce a vote. Drummer Nick Mason said: "It's about people making choices, yeas or nays."

Produced a few years after the collapse of the Eastern Bloc, "A Great Day for Freedom" juxtaposes the general euphoria of the fall of the Berlin Wall, with the subsequent wars and ethnic cleansing, particularly in Yugoslavia. Audio samples of Stephen Hawking, originally recorded for a BT television advertisement, were used in "Keep Talking"; Gilmour was so moved by Hawking's sentiment in the advert that he contacted the advertising company for permission to use the recordings. Mason said it felt "politically incorrect to take ideas from advertising, but it seemed a very relevant piece". At the end of the album Gilmour's stepson Charlie is heard hanging up the telephone receiver on Pink Floyd manager Steve O'Rourke, who had pleaded to be allowed to appear on a Pink Floyd album.

Title and packaging

To avoid competing against other album releases, as had happened with A Momentary Lapse, Pink Floyd set a deadline of April 1994, at which point they would begin a new tour. By January of that year, however, the band still had not decided on an album title. Titles considered included Pow Wow and Down to Earth. At a dinner one night, writer Douglas Adams, spurred by the promise of a payment to his favourite charity, the Environmental Investigation Agency, suggested The Division Bell, a term which appears in "High Hopes".

Longtime Floyd collaborator Storm Thorgerson provided the album artwork. He erected two large metal heads, each the height of a double-decker bus, in a field near Stuntney, Cambridgeshire. The sculptures were positioned together and photographed in profile, and can be seen as two faces talking to each other or as a single, third face. Thorgerson said the "third absent face" was a reference to Syd Barrett. The sculptures were devised by Keith Breeden, and constructed by John Robertson. Ely Cathedral is visible on the horizon. The pictures were shot in February for optimal lighting conditions. In 2001, the sculptures were in the Rock and Roll Hall of Fame in Cleveland, Ohio. In 2017, they were moved to the London Victoria and Albert Museum for display in a Pink Floyd exhibition. An alternate version of the cover photo, featuring two  stone sculptures by Aden Hynes, was used on the compact cassette release and the tour brochure.

Release and sales
On 10 January 1994 a press reception to announce The Division Bell and world tour was held at a former US Naval Air Station in North Carolina, in the US. A purpose-built Skyship 600 airship, manufactured in the UK, toured the US until it returned to Weeksville, and was destroyed by a thunderstorm on 27 June. Pieces of the aircraft were sold as souvenirs. The band held another reception, in the UK, on 21 March. This time they used an A60 airship, translucent, and painted to look like a fish, which took journalists on a tour of London. The airship, which was lit internally so it glowed in the night sky, was also flown in northern Europe.

The Division Bell was released in the UK by EMI Records on 28 March 1994, and in the US on 4 April, and went straight to #1 in both countries. The Division Bell was certified silver and gold in the UK on 1 April 1994, platinum a month later and 2× platinum on 1 October. In the US, it was certified gold and double platinum on 6 June 1994, and triple platinum on 29 January 1999.

In the United States the album debuted at number one in the Billboard 200 during the week of 23 April 1994 selling more than 460,000 units, at the time it was the 12th largest single-week total since Billboard began using SoundScan data in May 1991 and also became the fifth-largest first-week sales sum back then. The next week it stayed at the top of the chart selling a little less than half its first-week total, it moved 226,000 units during its second week on chart. The next week sales slid by 30% from last week's sum selling 157,000 units, despite this sales decrease the album stayed at number one. The following week, on 14 May 1994 The Division Bell remained at number one on the Billboard 200 and sales declined by 17%. In its fifth week, it fell off to the fourth place on the chart. It was present on the Billboard 200 for 53 weeks. It was certified three times platinum by the RIAA on 29 January 1999 for shipments of three million units.

Tour

Two days after the album's release, the Division Bell Tour began at Joe Robbie Stadium, in suburban Miami. The set list began with 1967's "Astronomy Domine", before moving to tracks from 1987's A Momentary Lapse of Reason, and The Division Bell. Songs from Wish You Were Here and The Wall were featured, as well as the whole Dark Side of the Moon. Backing musicians included Sam Brown, Jon Carin, Claudia Fontaine, Durga McBroom, Dick Parry, Guy Pratt, Tim Renwick, and Gary Wallis. The tour continued in the US through April, May and mid-June, before moving to Canada, and then returning to the US in July. As the tour reached Europe in late July, Waters declined an invitation to join the band, and later expressed his annoyance that Pink Floyd songs were being performed again in large venues. On the first night of the UK leg of the tour on 12 October, a 1,200-capacity stand collapsed, but with no serious injuries; the performance was rescheduled.

During the tour, an anonymous person using the name Publius posted on an internet newsgroup, inviting fans to solve a riddle supposedly concealed in the album. The message was verified during a show in East Rutherford, where lights in front of the stage spelled out "Enigma Publius". During a televised concert at Earls Court, London, in October 1994, the word "enigma" was projected in large letters on to the backdrop of the stage. Mason later acknowledged that the riddle, known as the Publius engima, was created by the record company. It remains unsolved.

The tour ended at Earls Court on 29 October 1994, and was Pink Floyd's final concert performance until Live 8 in 2005. Estimates placed the total number of tickets sold at over 5.3 million, and gross income at about $100 million. A live album and video, Pulse, was released in June 1995.

Critical reception 

The Division Bell received mixed reviews on release. Tom Sinclair of Entertainment Weekly wrote that "avarice is the only conceivable explanation for this glib, vacuous cipher of an album, which is notable primarily for its stomach-turning merger of progressive-rock pomposity and New Age noodling". Rolling Stone Tom Graves criticised Gilmour's performance, stating that his guitar solos had "settled into rambling, indistinct asides that are as forgettable as they used to be indelible ... only on 'What Do You Want from Me' does Gilmour sound like he cares".

The album won the Grammy for Best Rock Instrumental Performance on "Marooned". The Division Bell was nominated for the 1995 Brit Award for Best Album by a British Artist, but lost to Blur's Parklife.

In Uncut's 2011 Pink Floyd: The Ultimate Music Guide, Graeme Thomson wrote that The Division Bell  "might just be the dark horse of the Floyd canon. The opening triptych of songs is a hugely impressive return to something very close to the eternal essence of Pink Floyd, and much of the rest retains a quiet power and a meditative quality that betrays a genuine sense of unity." In 2014, Uncut reviewed the album again for its 20th-anniversary reissue, and praised its production, writing that it sounded much "more like a classic Pink Floyd album" than The Final Cut (1983) and that the connection between Wright and Gilmour was "the album's musical heart". Roger Waters, who left Pink Floyd in 1985, dismissed The Division Bell as "just rubbish ... nonsense from beginning to end."

Reissues 
The Division Bell was reissued in 2011. It was remastered by Andy Jackson and released as a standalone CD and as part of the Discovery box set which collects all of the 14 studio albums together for the first time. It was reissued again on 30 June 2014, as a "20th anniversary deluxe edition" box set and a 20th anniversary double-LP vinyl reissue. The box set contains the 2011 remaster of the album; a 5.1 surround sound remix by Jackson; 2-LP record on 180g vinyl; a red 7" "Take It Back" single; a clear 7" "High Hopes/Keep Talking" single; a blue, laser-etched 12" "High Hopes" single; book and assorted art cards. The 2014 reissues saw the first release of the full album on vinyl as the 1994 vinyl release saw only edited versions of the songs to keep it to a single LP. The Division Bell was reissued again with the Pink Floyd Records label on 26 August 2016.

A limited-edition 25th anniversary double-LP was announced on 11 April 2019, with a release date set for 7 June. The reissue is on blue vinyl and uses the two-LP master created for the 20th anniversary vinyl release.

Track listing

Original release

LP

20th anniversary double-LP edition

Personnel

Pink Floyd
David Gilmour – lead vocals (2, 3, 5, 7-11), acoustic, electric, classical & steel guitars, bass guitar (3, 5, 10, 11), keyboards, programming, backing vocals, talkbox, production, mixing
Nick Mason – drums, percussion, church bell (11)
Richard Wright – piano, organ and synthesizers, lead vocals (6), backing vocals (2)

Additional musicians
Jon Carin – piano, keyboards, programming, arrangements(10)
Guy Pratt – bass guitar (2, 4, 6-9)
Gary Wallis – percussion (8), programming (9)
Tim Renwick – additional guitars (3, 7)
Dick Parry – tenor saxophone (6)
Bob Ezrin – percussion, keyboards (3, 7), production
Sam Brown – backing vocals (2, 6, 7, 9)
Durga McBroom – backing vocals (2, 6, 7, 9)
Carol Kenyon – backing vocals (2, 6, 7, 9)
Jackie Sheridan – backing vocals (2, 6, 7, 9)
Rebecca Leigh-White – backing vocals (2, 6, 7, 9)
Stephen Hawking – vocal samples (9)

Production
Andrew Jackson – engineering
Michael Kamen – orchestral arrangements on A Great Day for Freedom and High Hopes
Edward Shearmur – orchestrations on High Hopes
Steve McLoughlin – orchestra recording
Chris Thomas – mixing
James Guthrie – mastering engineer
Doug Sax – mastering engineer
Storm Thorgerson – album art design
Tony May – photography
Rupert Truman – photography
Stephen Piotrowski – photography
Ian Wright – graphics
Aubrey Powell – album art design

Charts

Weekly charts

Year-end charts

Certifications and sales

References
Notes

Footnotes

Bibliography

External links

The Division Bell 20th Anniversary Website (archive)

1994 albums
Albums produced by Bob Ezrin
Albums produced by David Gilmour
Albums with cover art by Storm Thorgerson
Columbia Records albums
EMI Records albums
Pink Floyd albums
Concept albums
Albums recorded in a home studio